The black-striped snake eel (Callechelys catostoma, also known commonly as the dark band snake eel) is an eel in the family Ophichthidae (worm/snake eels). It was described by Johann Gottlob Theaenus Schneider and Johann Reinhold Forster in 1801. It is a tropical, marine eel which is known from the Indo-Pacific, including the Red Sea, East Africa, the Society Islands, the Ryukyu Islands, and Lord Howe Island. It dwells at a depth range of 1–32 metres, and inhabits reefs. It burrows into loose gravel and sand. Males can reach a maximum total length of 85 centimetres.

References

Ophichthidae
Taxa named by Johann Gottlob Theaenus Schneider
Taxa named by Johann Reinhold Forster
Fish described in 1801